The Honam Expressway (Korean: 호남고속도로; Honam Gosok Doro) is an expressway serving the Honam region in South Korea.  The freeway connects Nonsan on the Nonsan-Cheonan Expressway and Honam Expressway Branch Line to Gwangju and Suncheon on the Namhae Expressway.  The freeway's route number is 25.  The Honam Expressway Branch (Honam Gosokdoroui Jiseon), (호남고속도로의지선) is route number 251, and connects Nonsan on the Honam Expressway to Daejeon on the Gyeongbu Expressway.

History 
 April 15, 1970: Construction Begin
 December 30, 1970: Daejeon-Jeonju section (79.1 km) opened to traffic.
 November 14, 1973: Jeonju-Suncheon section (181.6 km) opened to traffic.
 June 1, 1978: Begins becoming charged.
 April 25, 1983: Work begins to widen to four lanes in Daejeon-Jeonju Section.
 June 30, 1986: The 4-lane expansion of the Daejeon–Jeonju section was completed.
 September 11, 1986: The 4-lane expansion of the Jeonju–Gwangju section was completed.
 September 1, 1989: The 4-lane expansion of the section in Gwangju (W.Gwangju IC-Goseo JCT) was completed.
 November 8, 1996: The 4-lane expansion of the Gwangju-Suncheon section was completed.
 January 1, 1999: West Jeonju Interchange (서전주IC) opened to traffic.
 August 25, 2001: Divides between Honam Expressway (Suncheon–Nonsan) to Honam Expressway Branch (Nonsan-Daejeon)
 August 31, 2002: Naejangsan IC (내장산IC) opened to traffic.
 December 29, 2004: Dongnim IC (동림IC) opened to traffic.
 May 15, 2007: Sanwol JCT (산월분기점) opened to traffic.
 December 17, 2009: The eight-lane expansion of the Munheung-Goseo section was completed and Munheung JCT (문흥분기점) opened to traffic.
 July 20, 2010: The six-lane expansion of the East Gwangju-Munheung section was completed.
 October 27, 2010: The six, eight-lane expansion of the Samnye-Nonsan section was completed.
 August 1, 2012: Motjae Tunnel (못재터널) opened to traffic.
 January 20, 2016: North Gwangsan Interchange (북광산IC) opened to traffic.

Compositions

Lanes 
 W. Suncheon IC–Goseo JC, E. Gwangju IC–Samnye IC: 4
 Munheung JC–E. Gwangju IC, Samnye IC–Iksan JC: 6
 Goseo JC–Munheung JC, Iksan JC–Nonsan JC: 8

Length 
194.22 km

Speed limits
 100 km/h

List of facilities

IC: Interchange, JC: Junction, SA: Service area, TG:Tollgate

Branch line (Nonsan-Daejeon)
 see Honam Expressway Branch

Expressways in South Korea
Roads in South Jeolla
Roads in Gwangju
Roads in North Jeolla
Roads in South Chungcheong